Leandro Navarro (born 16 April 1992) is an Argentine professional footballer who plays as midfielder for Danubio.

Honours
San Lorenzo
Argentine Primera División: 2013 Inicial
Copa Libertadores: 2014

References

1992 births
Living people
Sportspeople from Mar del Plata
Argentine footballers
Argentine expatriate footballers
Association football midfielders
San Lorenzo de Almagro footballers
Racing Club de Avellaneda footballers
Aldosivi footballers
Argentinos Juniors footballers
Venados F.C. players
Club Atlético Mitre footballers
Club Atlético Alvarado players
Danubio F.C. players
Argentine Primera División players
Primera Nacional players
Liga MX players
Argentine expatriate sportspeople in Mexico
Argentine expatriate sportspeople in Uruguay
Expatriate footballers in Mexico
Expatriate footballers in Uruguay